A list of films produced in Italy in 1930 (see 1930 in film):

See also
List of Italian films of 1929
List of Italian films of 1931

External links
Italian films of 1930 at the Internet Movie Database

Italian
1930
Films